From February to April 2003, the local weather forecast offices of the National Weather Service confirmed 217 tornadoes in the United States. There were no tornadoes confirmed in the month of January, marking only the fifth time since accurate records began in 1950 that an entire calendar month went tornado-free.

January
January had no tornadoes confirmed in the United States. It was only the fifth time since 1950 that an entire calendar month went tornado-free. The other months were; October 1952, December 1963, November 1976, and January 1986.

February
There were 18 tornadoes confirmed in the US in February.

March
There were 43 tornadoes confirmed in the US in March.

April
There were 156 tornadoes reported in the US in April.

April 4–7

A tornado outbreak spawned 41 tornadoes from Idaho to Alabama. There were no fatalities, but 14 people were injured.

April 15

A small tornado outbreak struck Oklahoma and Texas, injuring one.

April 30 event

Confirmed tornadoes

See also
 Tornadoes of 2003

References

 01
Tornado,01
Tornado
Tornado
Tornado
2003, 01